Frank Mayfield may refer to:

 Frank H. Mayfield (born 1939), member of the Ohio House of Representatives
 Frank Henderson Mayfield (1908–1991), American neurosurgeon